is a manga by Atsushi Suzumi. It was first serialized in Monthly Shōnen Sirius in Japan from 2006 to 2007, and was licensed by Del Rey Manga in North America.

Manga

Reception 
"While I have hope that a future volume will make use of the story’s potential, the first volume is, unfortunately, unremarkable." — Thomas Zoth, Mania.
"The visual storytelling shows off the mangaka’s strengths nicely, though the story itself lacks the same depth of skill." — Melinda Beasi, Pop Culture Shock.
"A charismatic lead character and a healthy dose of magic give this series its sparkle, but the poor story execution drags it down to a C+." — Carlo Santos, Anime News Network.
"This is not great work, but the making of this manga was certainly inspired." — Leroy Douresseaux, Comic Book Bin.
"Amefurashi is a fun adventure and the art style has the trademarks of Atsushi Suzumi’s love for girls in various costumes." — Holly Ellingwood, Active Anime.
"Interesting characters, a unique setting and the beginning of a grand adventure and struggle provide a strong initial effort." — Dan Polley, Comics Village.

References

Further reading

External links 
 

Action anime and manga
Comedy anime and manga
Del Rey Manga
Kodansha manga
Shōnen manga